Fode Mamadou Toure (April 1, 1910 in Baccoro, Guinea – April 11, 1992) was a politician from Guinea who served in the French Senate from 1955 to 1958. He was Minister of Economy and Finance of Guinea from 1972 to 1984.

References 
 page on the French Senate website

Finance ministers of Guinea
Guinean politicians
French Senators of the Fourth Republic
1910 births
1992 deaths
Senators of French West Africa